Parfyonovo is a rural locality (a village) in Parfyonovskoye Rural Settlement, Velikoustyugsky District, Vologda Oblast, Russia. The population was 12 as of 2002.

Geography 
Parfyonovo is located 20 km south of Veliky Ustyug (the district's administrative centre) by road. Nizhneye Gribtsovo is the nearest rural locality.

References 

Rural localities in Velikoustyugsky District